35E may refer to:
Area of Concentration 35E, a United States Army officer occupational specialty
Intelsat 35e, satellite operated by Intelsat
Kh-35E, variant of Russian missile Kh-35